Bábolna is a town in Komárom-Esztergom county, Hungary.

Bábolna houses the famous riding school, Pettko-Szandtner Tibor Lovas Szakiskola es Kollegium and a world-famous stud farm.

References

External links

  in Hungarian
  Street map

Populated places in Komárom-Esztergom County